The Chestnut Street Baptist Church (also Quinn Chapel African Methodist Episcopal Church) is a historic church at 912 W. Chestnut Street in Louisville, Kentucky.  It was built in 1884 and added to the National Register of Historic Places in 1980.

It was deemed significant as "a significant example of Gothic Revival ecclesiastical architecture in Louisville. It is also an important part of
the history of one of the city's earliest and most important black congregations."

It was designed by German-born architect Henry Wolters.  It is an "ornate Gothic Revival structure. The red brick church is richly ornamented with terra cotta. The facade of the structure consists of a central gabled section with two towers."

References

Baptist churches in Kentucky
African Methodist Episcopal churches in Kentucky
Churches on the National Register of Historic Places in Kentucky
Gothic Revival church buildings in Kentucky
Churches completed in 1884
19th-century Baptist churches in the United States
Churches in Louisville, Kentucky
African-American history in Louisville, Kentucky
National Register of Historic Places in Louisville, Kentucky
1884 establishments in Kentucky